Indiscreet (1998) is a thriller  TV movie starring Luke Perry and Gloria Reuben.

Plot 
Zachariah Dodd, a rich lawyer, hires Michael Nash (played by Luke Perry),a private investigator, to obtain evidences that is wife, Eve Dodd (played by Gloria Reuben) is unfaithful so he can divorce her. Michael Nash discovers instead that Eve is rather  physically abused by her husband and have committed no adultery. She attempts to commit suicide to escape from the torments of her  marriage by drowning herself naked into the sea. Michael rescues Eve and became her lover. The two begin secretly a love affair.

One night, Eve accidentally shoots her husband dead. Michael proposes his help to Eve to cover her and avoid being suspected for her husband's death.

Cast 

 Luke Perry as Michael Nash
 Gloria Reuben as Eve Dodd
 James Read as Zachariah Dodd
 Adam Baldwin as Jeremy Butler
 Lisa Edelstein as Beth Sussman
 Vladimir Nemirovsky as Sean Brodie

External links 
 
 

1998 television films
1998 films
1990s English-language films